The Eastern River is a  tributary of the Kennebec River in Maine. It rises in East Pittston at the confluence of its west and east branches and flows southwest past Dresden Mills to its mouth at the Kennebec, at the town boundary between Dresden and Perkins.

See also
List of rivers of Maine

References

Maine Streamflow Data from the USGS
Maine Watershed Data From Environmental Protection Agency

Tributaries of the Kennebec River
Rivers of Maine
Rivers of Kennebec County, Maine
Rivers of Lincoln County, Maine
Rivers of Sagadahoc County, Maine